Lanurile may refer to several villages in Romania:

 Lanurile, a village in Viziru Commune, Brăila County
 Lanurile, a village in Ziduri Commune, Buzău County
 Lanurile, a village in Bărăganu Commune, Constanța County